O. E. Walker House is at 906 Madison Street, Kingman, Arizona. The house was built around c. 1916. The house is in Bungalow/Craftsman style. The house is the only stone bungalow/Neo Colonial Revival style in Kingman. The house was built in native stone. Mr. Walker was member of Mohave County Board of Supervisors. Minnie E. Gulley set up operation of hospital in the house on August 19. It was known as the first hospital in Kingman. The house is on the National Register of Historical Places and the number is 86001175.

It was evaluated for National Register listing as part of a 1985 study of 63 historic resources in Kingman that led to this and many others being listed.

References

Houses on the National Register of Historic Places in Arizona
Houses completed in 1916
Houses in Kingman, Arizona
National Register of Historic Places in Kingman, Arizona